Kori Carter (born June 3, 1992) is an American  track and field athlete specializing in hurdle races, the World Champion in the 400 metres hurdles event in 2017. Kori Carter was a nine-time All-American at Stanford University sponsored by Jordan Brand.

Prep
While at Claremont High School, in Claremont, California, Carter won the CIF California State Meet in both hurdle races her junior and senior years (2009–10) while winning the 300 hurdles in 2008.  She made the final in both races all four years, the first of those as a freshman in 2007 was the race where Vashti Thomas set the current National record in the 100 metres hurdles.

NCAA
Kori Carter was a nine-time All-American at Stanford University sponsored by Nike.

As a Junior, on June 8, 2013, Carter won the NCAA Women's Outdoor Track and Field Championship in the 400 metres hurdles in collegiate record time of 53.21.  That mark tied triple Olympic gold medalist Marie-José Pérec for number 20 on the all-time list. Carter was a 2013 Bowerman finalist.

Professional
Kori ran 55.69 in 400 meters at 2013 USA Outdoor Track and Field Championships on June 21, 2013.

Carter won the 400 meter hurdles at the 2014 USA Outdoor Track and Field Championships.

At the 2015 USA Outdoor Track and Field Championships in Eugene, Oregon Kori placed 3rd in the 400m hurdles in 54.41, to go on to represent the U.S. for the 400m hurdles in the 2015 World Championships in Athletics in Beijing, China in August.

At the 2016 United States Olympic Trials (track and field) in Eugene, Oregon Kori placed 4th in the 400m  hurdles in 54.47 but failed to qualify for the 2016 Olympics in Rio.

At the 2017 USA Outdoor Track and Field Championships in Sacramento Kori placed 3rd in the 400m hurdles in 52.95, to represent the U.S. for the 400m hurdles in the 2017 World Championships in Athletics in London, where she won the world championship at 53.08.

At the 2018 USA Indoor Track and Field Championships in Albuquerque, New Mexico, Kori Carter placed 9th in the 60m hurdles in 8.03.

At the 2018 USA Outdoor Track and Field Championships in Des Moines, Iowa Kori Carter placed 6th in the 100m hurdles in 13.11.

International competitions

References

1992 births
Living people
American female hurdlers
Stanford Cardinal women's track and field athletes
Track and field athletes from Los Angeles
American female sprinters
African-American female track and field athletes
World Athletics Championships athletes for the United States
World Athletics Championships medalists
World Athletics Championships winners
USA Outdoor Track and Field Championships winners
21st-century African-American sportspeople
21st-century African-American women